Umberto Calzolari (4 June 1938 – 29 July 2018) was an Italian baseball player.

Biography
Nicknamed "Professor", Calzolari played in ACLI Bologna from 1958 to 1963, when the team merged into Fortitudo Bologna. With Fortitudo Bologna he won three championships – in 1969, in 1972 and in 1974 – and a European Champion Clubs' Cup in 1973.

Fortitudo Bologna retired his number (8), and, in 1982, La Fibs awarded him the Golden Diamond for his career.

In 1993 with Alfredo Meli he founded the AIBxC (Italian Baseball Association for the Blind).

In 2014 he was included in the Italian Hall of Fame of baseball and softball as a coach.

He died in 2018 at the age of 80.

References

1938 births
2018 deaths
Baseball outfielders
Baseball pitchers
Fortitudo Baseball Bologna players
Italian baseball players
Sportspeople from Bologna